Moscow Basketball Derby is the name given to professional basketball games between CSKA Moscow of Moscow, and Khimki Moscow Region, from Khimki in Moscow Oblast.

It is considered to be the biggest rivalry in Russian basketball. Until 2016, there was also a third Moscow-based basketball club, Dynamo Moscow, which had an even bigger local derby with CSKA, as the two teams were from Moscow city itself. However, the Dynamo Moscow club folded in 2016.

Head-to-head statistics

Updated as of 6 January 2020

Titles comparison

References

External links
CSKA official website
Khimki official website

Basketball rivalries
BC Khimki
CSKA Moscow
Basketball competitions in Russia
Sports competitions in Moscow